Macaduma samoensis is a moth of the subfamily Arctiinae. It was described by Tams in 1935. It is found on Samoa.

References

Macaduma
Moths described in 1935